Duayaw Nkwanta is a town and the capital of Tano North Municipal District, a municipal in the Ahafo Region of Ghana. It is located close to Sunyani, the capital of Bono Region. The infrastructure of Duayaw Nkwanta is well structured. Duayaw Nkwanta has a settlement population of 27,476.
This town boast of good schools such as: Boakye Tromo Senior High Technical School, Serwaa Kesse Girls Senior High School, Presbyterian Midwifery Training College among others.

Economy
Agriculture is the main occupation among the workforce of Duayaw Nkwanta.
Arts, Education and Entertainment being the children and youth's target
Good Place for Business and Marketing, Nice Patronage and Good Population

Health
Duayaw Nkwanta has one of the best hospitals in Brong-Ahafo. It is known as the Saint John of God of Hospital. The hospital has an excellent orthopaedic centre. It is rated among the top three in Ghana.

Education
Duayaw Nkwanta is also known for the Boakye Tromo Secondary Technical School. It also has a female girls' Senior High School known as, Serwah Kesse High School. Formerly, it was a mixed school by the name of Duayaw-Nkwanta Secondary School, St. John of God College of Health, Presbyterian Midwifery

References

Populated places in the Ahafo Region